Semele (Ancient Greek: Σεμέλη ), in Greek mythology, was the youngest daughter of Cadmus and Harmonia, and the mother of Dionysus by Zeus in one of his many origin myths.

Certain elements of the cult of Dionysus and Semele came from the Phrygians. These were modified, expanded, and elaborated by the Ionian Greek invaders and colonists. Doric Greek historian Herodotus (c. 484–425 BC), born in the city of Halicarnassus under the Achaemenid Empire, who gives the account of Cadmus, estimates that Semele lived either 1,000 or 1,600 years prior to his visit to Tyre in 450 BC at the end of the Greco-Persian Wars (499–449 BC) or around 2050 or 1450 BC. In Rome, the goddess Stimula was identified as Semele.

Etymology
According to some linguists the name Semele is Thraco-Phrygian, derived from a PIE root meaning 'earth' (*Dʰéǵʰōm). Julius Pokorny reconstructs her name from the PIE root * meaning 'earth' and relates it with Thracian , 'mother earth'. However, Burkert says that while Semele is "manifestly non-Greek", he also says that "it is no more possible to confirm that Semele is a Thraco-Phrygian word for earth than it is to prove the priority of the Lydian  over Bacchus as a name for Dionysos".

Etymological connections of Thraco-Phrygian  with
Thus, according to Borissoff, "she could be an important link bridging the ancient Thracian and Slavonic cults (...)".

Mythology

Seduction by Zeus and birth of Dionysus 
In one version of the myth, Semele was a priestess of Zeus, and on one occasion was observed by Zeus as she slaughtered a bull at his altar and afterwards swam in the river Asopus to cleanse herself of the blood. Flying over the scene in the guise of an eagle, Zeus fell in love with Semele and repeatedly visited her secretly.

Zeus' wife, Hera, a goddess jealous of usurpers, discovered his affair with Semele when she later became pregnant. Appearing as an old crone, Hera befriended Semele, who confided in her that her lover was actually Zeus. Hera pretended not to believe her, and planted seeds of doubt in Semele's mind. Curious, Semele asked Zeus to grant her a boon. Zeus, eager to please his beloved, promised on the River Styx to grant her anything she wanted. She then demanded that Zeus reveal himself in all his glory as proof of his divinity. Though Zeus begged her not to ask this, she persisted and he was forced by his oath to comply. Zeus tried to spare her by showing her the smallest of his bolts and the sparsest thunderstorm clouds he could find. Mortals, however, cannot look upon the gods without incinerating, and she perished, consumed in a lightning-ignited flame.

Zeus rescued the fetal Dionysus, however, by sewing him into his thigh (whence the epithet Eiraphiotes, 'insewn', of the Homeric Hymn). A few months later, Dionysus was born. This leads to his being called "the twice-born".

When he grew up, Dionysus rescued his mother from Hades, and she became a goddess on Mount Olympus, with the new name Thyone, presiding over the frenzy inspired by her son Dionysus. At a later point in Dionysiaca, Semele, now resurrected, boasts to her sister Ino how Cronida ('Kronos's son', that is, Zeus), "the plower of her field", carried on the gestation of Dionysus and now her son gets to join the heavenly deities in Olympus, while Ino languishes with a murderous husband (since Athamas tried to kill Ino and her son), and a son that lives with maritime deities.

Impregnation by Zeus

There is a story in the Fabulae 167 of Gaius Julius Hyginus, or a later author whose work has been attributed to Hyginus. In this, Dionysus (called Liber) is the son of Jupiter and Proserpina, and was killed by the Titans.  Jupiter gave his torn up heart in a drink to Semele, who became pregnant this way.  But in another account, Zeus swallows the heart himself, in order to beget his seed on Semele.  Hera then convinces Semele to ask Zeus to come to her as a god, and on doing so she dies, and Zeus seals the unborn baby up in his thigh.
As a result of this Dionysus "was also called Dimetor [of two mothers]... because the two Dionysoi were born of one father, but of two mothers"

Still another variant of the narrative is found in Callimachus and the 5th century CE Greek writer Nonnus.<ref>Nonnus, Dionysiaca 24. 43 ff — translation in Zagreus</ref> In this version, the first Dionysus is called Zagreus. Nonnus does not present the conception as virginal; rather, the editor's notes say that Zeus swallowed Zagreus' heart, and visited the mortal woman Semele, whom he seduced and made pregnant. Nonnus classifies Zeus's affair with Semele as one in a set of twelve, the other eleven women on whom he begot children being Io, Europa, Plouto, Danaë, Aigina, Antiope, Leda, Dia, Alcmene, Laodameia, the mother of Sarpedon, and Olympias.

Locations
The most usual setting for the story of Semele is the palace that occupied the acropolis of Thebes, called the Cadmeia. When Pausanias visited Thebes in the 2nd century CE, he was shown the very bridal chamber where Zeus visited her and begat Dionysus. Since an Oriental inscribed cylindrical seal found at the palace can be dated 14th-13th centuries, the myth of Semele must be Mycenaean or earlier in origin. At the Alcyonian Lake near the prehistoric site of Lerna, Dionysus, guided by Prosymnus or Polymnus, descended to Tartarus to free his once-mortal mother. Annual rites took place there in classical times; Pausanias refuses to describe them.

Though the Greek myth of Semele was localized in Thebes, the fragmentary Homeric Hymn to Dionysus makes the place where Zeus gave a second birth to the god a distant one, and mythically vague:
"For some say, at Dracanum; and some, on windy Icarus; and some, in Naxos, O Heaven-born, Insewn; and others by the deep-eddying river Alpheus that pregnant Semele bare you to Zeus the thunder-lover.  And others yet, lord, say you were born in Thebes; but all these lie. The Father of men and gods gave you birth remote from men and secretly from white-armed Hera. There is a certain Nysa, a mountain most high and richly grown with woods, far off in Phoenice, near the streams of Aegyptus..."

Semele was worshipped at Athens at the Lenaia, when a yearling bull, emblematic of Dionysus, was sacrificed to her. One-ninth was burnt on the altar in the Hellenic way; the rest was torn and eaten raw by the votaries.

A unique tale, "found nowhere else in Greece" and considered to be a local version of her legend, is narrated by geographer Pausanias in his Description of Greece: after giving birth to her semi-divine son, Dionysus, fathered by Zeus, Semele was banished from the realm by her father Cadmus. Their sentence was to be put into a chest or a box and cast in the sea. Luckily, the casket they were in washed up by the waves at Prasiae.Larson, Jennifer. Greek Heroine Cults. Madison, Wis: University of Wisconsin Press, 1995. pp. 94-95. However, it has been suggested that this tale might have been a borrowing from the story of Danaë and Perseus.Guettel Cole, Susan. "Under the Open Sky: Imagining the Dionysian Landscape". In: Human Development in Sacred Landscapes: Between Ritual Tradition, Creativity and Emotionality. V&R Unipress. 2015. p. 65.  DOI: https://doi.org/10.14220/9783737002523.61Semele was a tragedy by Aeschylus; it has been lost, save a few lines quoted by other writers, and a papyrus fragment from Oxyrhynchus, P. Oxy. 2164.

In Etruscan culture
Semele is attested with the Etruscan name form Semla, depicted on the back of a bronze mirror from the fourth century BC.

In Roman culture
In ancient Rome, a grove (lucus) near Ostia, situated between the Aventine Hill and the mouth of the Tiber River, was dedicated to a goddess named Stimula. W.H. Roscher includes the name Stimula among the indigitamenta, the lists of Roman deities maintained by priests to assure that the correct divinity was invoked in public rituals. In his poem on the Roman calendar, Ovid (d. 17 CE) identifies this goddess with Semele:

Augustine notes that the goddess is named after , 'goads, whips,' by means of which a person is driven to excessive actions. The goddess's grove was the site of the Dionysian scandal that led to official attempts to suppress the cult. The Romans viewed the Bacchanals with suspicion, based on reports of ecstatic behaviors contrary to Roman social norms and the secrecy of initiatory rite. In 186 BC, the Roman senate took severe actions to limit the cult, without banning it. Religious beliefs and myths associated with Dionysus were successfully adapted and remained pervasive in Roman culture, as evidenced for instance by the Dionysian scenes of Roman wall painting and on sarcophagi from the 1st to the 4th centuries AD.

The Greek cult of Dionysus had flourished among the Etruscans in the archaic period, and had been made compatible with Etruscan religious beliefs. One of the main principles of the Dionysian mysteries that spread to Latium and Rome was the concept of rebirth, to which the complex myths surrounding the god's own birth were central. Birth and childhood deities were important to Roman religion; Ovid identifies Semele's sister Ino as the nurturing goddess Mater Matuta. This goddess had a major cult center at Satricum that was built 500–490 BC. The female consort who appears with Bacchus in the acroterial statues there may be either Semele or Ariadne. The pair were part of the Aventine Triad in Rome as Liber and Libera, along with Ceres. The temple of the triad is located near the Grove of Stimula, and the grove and its shrine (sacrarium) were located outside Rome's sacred boundary (pomerium), perhaps as the "dark side" of the Aventine Triad.
In the classical tradition
In the later mythological tradition of the Christian era, ancient deities and their narratives were often interpreted allegorically. In the Neoplatonic philosophy of Henry More (1614–1687), for instance, Semele was thought to embody "intellectual imagination", and was construed as the opposite of Arachne, "sense perception".

In the 18th century, the story of Semele formed the basis for three operas of the same name, the first by John Eccles (1707, to a libretto by William Congreve), another by Marin Marais (1709), and a third by George Frideric Handel (1742). Handel's work, based on Congreve's libretto but with additions, while an opera to its marrow, was originally given as an oratorio so that it could be performed in a Lenten concert series; it premiered on February 10, 1744. The German dramatist Schiller produced a singspiel entitled Semele in 1782. Victorian poet Constance Naden wrote a sonnet in the voice of Semele, first published in her 1881 collection Songs and Sonnets of Springtime. Paul Dukas composed a cantata, Sémélé.

 Genealogy 

Music

 Élisabeth Jacquet de la Guerre, Sémélé, cantata (1715) EJG 37
 Nikolaus Strungk, Semele, opera (1681)
 John Eccles, Semele, opera (1706)
 Marin Marais, Sémélé, tragédie en musique (1709)
 Fracesco Mancini, Sémélé, opera (1711)
 Antonio de Literes, Jupiter et Sémélé, opera (1718)
 André Cardinal Destouches, Sémélé, cantata (1719)
 Georg Friedrich Haendel, Semele, oratorio (1743)
 Michel Paul Guy de Chabanon, Sémélé, opera
 Paul Dukas, Sémélé, cantata (1889)

Notes

References

 (US )
Graves, Robert, 1960. The Greek MythsKerenyi, Carl, 1976. Dionysus: Archetypal Image of the Indestructible Life, (Bollingen, Princeton)
Kerenyi, Carl, 1951. The Gods of the Greeks pp. 256ff.
Seltman, Charles, 1956. The Twelve Olympians and their Guests''. Shenval Press Ltd.

See also
86 Semele

External links

Homeric Hymns
On Thyone
 Warburg Institute Iconographic Database (ca 50 images of Semele)
 
Naden's poem 'Semele'

Princesses in Greek mythology
Mortal parents of demigods in classical mythology
Mortal women of Zeus
Theban characters in Greek mythology
Theban mythology
Dionysus in mythology
Deeds of Hera
Deeds of Zeus
Olympian deities
Greek goddesses